Akiyoshia is a genus of freshwater snails with a gill and an operculum, aquatic gastropod mollusks in the family Amnicolidae.

Distribution 
The distribution of Akiyoshia includes Japan from whence it was described.

There are some indications that so-called "Akiyoshia" species from southern China may not be true Akiyoshia.

Description 
Species in the subgenus Saganoa from Japan are blind snails. "Akiyoshia" species from China are not blind.

Species
Species within the genus Akiyoshia include:

Subgenus Akiyoshia
 Akiyoshia uenoi Kuroda & Habe, 1954 - the type species, was described from Japan

Subgenus Saganoa Kuroda, Habe & Tamu, 1957
 "Akiyoshia" chinensis Liu, Zhang & Chen, 1982 - anatomy of this Chinese species was described in 1992,
 Akiyoshia kishiiana Kuroda, Habe & Tamu, 1957
 Akiyoshia morimotoi
 "Akiyoshia" yunnanensis Liu, Wang & Zhang, 1982

Nomina nuda:
 Akiyoshia odonta, Akiyoshia (Saganoa) odonta Feng et al., 1985 and Akiyoshia (Saganoa) odonta Feng et al., 1986 are nomina nuda.

Ecology 
The habitat for species in the Saganoa subgenus from Japan is caves and wells.

"Akiyoshia" species from China live in streams.

References

External links 
 https://web.archive.org/web/20110929141541/http://www.palaeos.org/Akiyoshia
  波部 忠重 Habe T. (1980). "カワネミジンツボ [Subterranean tiny snail Saganoa]. ちりぼたん Newsletter of the Malacological Society of Japan 11(4): 74-75. CiNIi.
  湊 宏 Minato H. (1986). "地下水棲微小巻貝を和歌山県から採集する [Subterranean Minute Snail, Akiyoshia (Saganoa) Collected from Wakayama-ken]". ちりぼたん Newsletter of the Malacological Society of Japan 17(2): 38-39. CiNii.
  佐野 基人 [他] (1979). "静岡県における肺吸虫の調査-2-宮崎肺吸虫の第1中間宿主Saganoa sp.およびその幼虫について". Japanese Journal of Parasitology 28(4): 211-217. CiNii.

Amnicolidae